This is a list of Tampa Bay Lightning award winners.

League awards

Team trophies

Individual awards

All-Stars

NHL first and second team All-Stars
The NHL first and second team All-Stars are the top players at each position as voted on by the Professional Hockey Writers' Association.

NHL All-Rookie Team
The NHL All-Rookie Team consists of the top rookies at each position as voted on by the Professional Hockey Writers' Association.

All-Star Game selections
The National Hockey League All-Star Game is a mid-season exhibition game held annually between many of the top players of each season. Twenty-one All-Star Games have been held since the Tampa Bay Lightning entered the league in 1992, with at least one player chosen to represent the Lightning in each year except 1998. The All-Star game has not been held in various years: 1979 and 1987 due to the 1979 Challenge Cup and Rendez-vous '87 series between the NHL and the Soviet national team, respectively, 1995, 2005, and 2013 as a result of labor stoppages, 2006, 2010, and 2014 because of the Winter Olympic Games, and 2021 as a result of the COVID-19 pandemic. Tampa Bay has hosted two All-Star games. The first was the 49th, which took place at the Ice Palace Arena. The second was the 63rd National Hockey League All-Star Game, which took place at Amalie Arena.

 Selected by fan vote
 Selected as one of four "last men in" by fan vote

Career achievements

Hockey Hall of Fame
The following is a list of Tampa Bay Lightning who have been enshrined in the Hockey Hall of Fame.

United States Hockey Hall of Fame

Retired numbers

The Tampa Bay Lightning have retired two numbers, which means that no player can use those uniform numbers again while part of the team. The most recently retired number is that of Vincent Lecavalier, whose number was retired on February 10, 2018. Also out of circulation is the number 99 which was retired league-wide for Wayne Gretzky on February 6, 2000. Gretzky did not play for the Lightning during his 20-year NHL career and no Lightning player had ever worn the number 99 prior to its retirement.

Other awards

See also
List of National Hockey League awards

Notes

References

Tampa Bay Lightning
award